Leslie Roy Phelps (24 January 1893 – 12 September 1972) was an Australian cricketer. He was a left-handed batsman and right-arm medium-fast bowler who played for Tasmania. He was born and died in Sydney.

Phelps made a single first-class appearance for the side, during the 1928–29 season, against New South Wales. From the tailend, he scored a single run in the first innings in which he batted, and a duck in the second, as Tasmania lost the match by an innings margin.

See also
 List of Tasmanian representative cricketers

References

External links
Leslie Phelps at Cricket Archive

1893 births
1972 deaths
Australian cricketers
Tasmania cricketers
Cricketers from Sydney